Galectin-3-binding protein is a protein that in humans is encoded by the LGALS3BP gene.

Function 

The galectins are a family of beta-galactoside-binding proteins implicated in modulating cell–cell and cell–matrix interactions.  Using fluorescence in–situ hybridization, the full length 90K cDNA has been localized to chromosome 17q25. The native protein binds specifically to a human macrophage-associated lectin known as Mac-2 and also binds to galectin 1.

Clinical significance 

LGALS3BP has been found elevated in the serum of patients with cancer and in those infected by the human immunodeficiency virus (HIV). It appears to be implicated in immune response associated with natural killer (NK) and lymphokine-activated killer (LAK) cell cytotoxicity.

Interactions
LGALS3BP has been shown to interact with LGALS3.

References

Further reading